The People's Public Security University of China (PPSUC) is a national public university for public security studies in Beijing, China. Founded in 1948, the university is affiliated with the Ministry of Public Security of China.

The university specialises in the training of elite police officers, and it is ranked as the best Chinese police academy since its merger with the People's Police Cadre University of China in 1998.  It is a Chinese state Double First Class University,  included in the Double First Class University Plan designed by the central government of China.

PPSUC has a law school, a department of foreign languages, literature, criminal investigation, criminology, management, information security, traffic control, forensic science, etc. Many Chinese overseas UN peacekeepers, after field service experience, are from the CPPSU, in particular the Foreign Languages Department. Its graduates have found employment in the Ministry of Public Security, Provincial Police Department, Municipal Police Department and other legal institutions at all levels in China. PPSUC now has two campuses, one at Muxidi and the other at Tuanhe.

History of People's Public Security University of China and People's Police University of China 

The People's Public Security University of China, which is the first public security university under The Ministry of Public Security, excels in the teaching and studying of police science (public security science), police technology, and relevant disciplines, offering the most number of programs of police science and technology in the country, and serves as an important base producing quality professionals with policing competence and global vision. 
This school was established in July, 1948. It was successively named North China Police Cadre School(华北公安干部学校), Central Police Cadre School(中央公安干部学校), Central People's Police School(中央人民公安学院) and Central Political and Legal Cadre School (中央政法干部学校). In January 1984, the school was established as a university with bachelor's and master's degree programs. However, the current PPSUC is a combination of the former PPSUC and the former The People's Police University of China (中国人民警官大学) after the 1998's University Amalgamation wave.

The People's Police University of China (PPUC), merged with PPSUC in 1998, was first established as Institute of International Politics in 1978. The IIP, along with China Foreign Affairs University, Institute for International Relations were all universities directly affiliated with certain ministries in the government and made them as the "Group 0" choice for Gaokao, which means they enroll students earlier than all the "Group 1" universities like Beijing University and Tsinghua University and were very competitive, aiming to strengthen the future talent pool for the government to choose after students' graduation. The IIP was at the beginning intelligence related and could be thought of an FBI school at its days. However, in 1982, as the government portfolio were changed, the IIP no longer served as an intelligence school and therefore renamed into Chinese People's Police University, ranking no.1 among all the police academy (excelled PPSUC ). In fact, not all the graduates of the school got automatically enrolled in the intelligence-related agencies after graduation.

The Amalgamation
In 1998, the two universities were merged under the name of PPSUC, despite the fact that the PPUC stands on a higher rank than PPSUC. The Amalgamation, like many other universities, was very controversial and was not all welcomed by many staff, faculty and police cadets, especially for the PPUC. The PPUC was more focused on non-police field such as Foreign Languages Department, Chinese Language and Literature Department, Science and Technology Department and Traffic Management Department. After the Amalgamation in 1998, these departments have seen various changes according to the appetite of PPSUC, which started to bring much more policing atmosphere.

For example, the foreign languages department (Dpt NO.1), once consisting five language studies section in English, Japanese, German, French and Russian, later all the students are English learning students. Then after the militarization of the organizational structure in 2002, the English department was changed into Department of International Police Studies, aiming basically at training students into police officers dealing with international police operation work, such as law enforcement cooperation with foreign counterparts, dealing with cases involving aliens, etc. at different levels of police departments. Their courses were added with more law and management courses while some English language modules were cancelled, which have made the English language teachers and some other staff worried about the English level of the students due to the smaller number of the English language modules.

Another example is the Chinese Language and literature Department(Dpt No.2), which was later changed into Department of Police Intelligence. More courses were added on intelligence and relevant law into their curriculum.

The other two departments were less influenced by the change in their curriculum. However, after 2002 with the militarization of the organizational structure, the administrative structure was changed from university-style focusing on department-style management of students to paramilitary-style focusing on brigade-style management.

Recruitment and ranks

The recruitment of police cadets (students) for PPSUC are from high school after the National College Entrance Examination (NCEE) each year and graduate students are required to have bachelor's degree or equivalent, disregarding about their job experience. As the competition is more fierce for entering the school, there has been an increase in the recruitment according to the statistics of National College Entrance Examination

For high School Students of Science Orientation

For High School Students  of Humanity Orientation

From the actual statistics, there are students who are qualified for Beijing University or Tsinghua University, however, as the university has strict requirements for physical conditions, physical performance, psychological state and eyesight, its selection pool would be limited and thus the lowest score and the highest score varied according to the applicants' situation each year.

The newly enrolled students would be regarded as police cadets. A cadet could raise to be a cadet Sergeant (区队长) during the four years' study. Cadet Sergent would be the highest position a cadet could make. Then the  Staff Sergent (中队长) and  Chief Staff Sergent (大队长) would both be occupied by full-time instructors. However, students' union has another system which is the same as the normal universities.

It is claimed that 97% to 99% graduates from the university could instantly find a job before their graduation. Although most of the graduate work in the police system, a few students went to further studies or changed their job.

Student life

Life in PPSUC is strict as it is managed in a similarly to a military academy after 2002, when most of the undergraduate cadets started their university life in Tuanhe. Students are asked to partake in morning exercises from Monday to Friday and the first three-month training for the new cadets are very fierce. It was normal that cadets of upper class would be their trainers and they could be very harsh toward them during the first three-month training. This way of training successfully sets up a hierarchy within the cadets in which upper class cadets are more respected and listened. Their words could be easily interpreted into certain types of orders, although not obligatory for lower class cadets.

The instructors, Staff Sergeant or Chief Staff Sergent, are all very critical toward the cadets at the beginning, causing self-denial mentality to the cadets. This can be used to form a detailed oriented habit of cadets and set up a power order between the cadets and the instructors. However, such behavior may be lessened in the later part of the four years training, although sometimes it may prove to be not effective on every individual.

In this way, the PPSUC cadets, faced with common challenges from the instructors and the strict system of management, could develop a deep and trusted relationship between cadets if things turned out to be right. However, it is claimed that failure to comply may result in depression, despair and other negative mentality.

Besides, The female cadets were only 5%-20% in the university.

The typical literature work reflecting the culture of PPSUC was The Years of Dries and Stirs (枯燥年华), written by a student once studied at the Chinese Language and Literature Department.

Co-op programs and Field Experience

As the PPSUC is aiming at training prospect police officers, field experience and "co-op programs" are weighing more in the curriculum than any other universities. Starting from the first year, the cadets are required to participate in field work in their winter and summer vacation at local police station or bureaus, enabling them with direction experience of police work. However, such cadets sometimes causes casualties for cadets although the number is very limited due to their unexpected encounter with criminals or events. In total, a cadet may have obtained six-month field experience at most by the start of the final year if the cadets were following such requirements.

Besides, all the senior students at the last year will have a two-month internship at local police bureaus, normally Beijing, Shanghai, and other cities.

In total, the cadets could be quite into the culture and real world before their graduation.

International Cooperation

PPSUC is aiming to be one of the best police academy in the world, establishing relations with many other famous police academies in the world, such as Korea National Police University in South Korea. PPSUC has been connected with such institutions or  governmental agencies from more than 60 countries including France, the United Kingdom, United States, and Australia.

PPSUC also provides training for officers or cadets from forty developing countries. Starting in 2009, CPPSU began training police officers from Hong Kong

The PPSUC has and Taiwan's Central Police University first official contact was in 2010. The head of the PPSUC, Chen Lin, paid a visit to CPU and Hou Youyi, head of CPU paid a reciprocal visit to PPSUC. In 2015 PPSUC and New Zealand's Royal New Zealand Police College (RNZPC) signed a Letter of Cooperation to formalize closer training and cooperation opportunities between the two schools.

Controversies

1. Infrastructure was built up before 2004. In 2004 a national police parade was held in the PPSUC. For such a parade, the university motivated all its resources and also spent ¥0.9 billion for renovation and infrastructure. Although the campus in Tuanhe was significantly renovated, even with an alleged largest university library in China (from physical capacity), criticism arose from the teachers and staff for having spent so much money on the construction of a luxurious library, which is not practical both for students and teachers.

2. Celebrities: Li Meijin and Wang Dawei, renowned professors of Department of Criminology.

References

External links
Official Website

Universities and colleges in Beijing
Law enforcement in China
Educational institutions established in 1948
1948 establishments in China
Police academies in China